The Haunted Bridge is the fifteenth volume in the Nancy Drew Mystery Stories series. It was originally published by Grosset & Dunlap in 1937. It was written by Mildred A. Wirt Benson. Its text was revised and published in 1972 by Priscilla Baker-Carr.

Plot summary

Nancy's father Carson Drew is on the trail of an international ring of jewel thieves, and asks her to assist him in his pursuit. The trail leads to a summer resort area. Before Nancy has a chance to start work on her father's case, a golf caddy tells her a frightening tale. In dense woods nearby is an old wooden footbridge guarded by a ghost! Intrigued by the caddy's story, Nancy decides to investigate. Several riddles confront the young detective as she attempts to solve the mystery of the haunted bridge and track down a woman suspected of being a key member of the gang of the jewelry thieves.

Nancy Drew books
1937 American novels
1937 children's books
Grosset & Dunlap books
Children's mystery novels